EX, Ex or The Ex may refer to:

Film and television
 Ex (2009 film), a comedy directed by Fausto Brizzi
 Ex (2010 film), a 2010 Hong Kong film starring Gillian Chung
 The Ex (1997 film), a Canadian thriller film by Mark L. Lester
 The Ex (2006 film), a comedy film
 The Ex, an episode of Matlock
 TV Asahi or EX, a TV station in Roppongi, Tokyo, Japan

Music
 The Ex (band), a Dutch punk band
 eX (Ipecac Loop album), 1995
 EX (Trigger album), 2011–2012
 EX (Plastikman album), 2014
 "The Ex" (song), a 2003 song by Billy Talent
 "Ex", a song by Ty Dolla Sign from his 2017 album Beach House 3
 "Ex", a song by Stray Kids from 2020 album Go Live
 "Ex", a 2019 song by Kiana Ledé
 "Ex" (Elvana Gjata, DJ Gimi-O and Bardhi song), 2022

Computing
 ex (text editor), for UNIX
 ex (typography), a unit of distance
 EX, the execute instruction on the System/360 and the IBM 7030

Mathematics
 Expected value or E(X)
 EX (calculator key), to enter powers of 10

Other sciences
 Extinct or EX, a conservation status
 ex, an author citation abbreviation in botany

Other uses
 The Ex (target), a mannequin gun target
 EX postcode area, around Exeter, England
 Canadian National Exhibition or The Ex
 Endurocross or EX, a motorcycling discipline
 Ex code, IEC60079 code for electrical equipment in hazardous areas

See also
 Relationship breakup
 X (disambiguation)
 X mark